Cenekal may refer to:
Senekal, town in South Africa
Xenical, drug